Red Banner was a symbol of revolutionary struggle used late Russian Empire, in Soviet Russia, and  in the USSR and the background of  the Soviet state flag and other similar flags. 

Military units, institutions and organizations (of the Soviet Army, Soviet Navy, MVD Internal Troops, etc.) awarded with the Order of the Red Banner are referred to with the honorific title "of the Red Banner" (Краснознамённый (krasnoznamyonny), e.g. The Red Banner Baltic Fleet or "The Twice Red Banner Alexandrov Soviet Army Choir"). 

Civilian establishments awarded the Order of the Red Banner of Labour are also sometimes addressed with the "Red-Banner" honorific.

Transferable Red Banner
The Transferable Red Banner was an award for collectives, winners in socialist emulation contests at various Soviet work places. The term "transferable" means that for a given kind of competition at a given establishment (enterprise, school, institute, clinic, etc.) or category of establishments (e.g., type of industry) there was a single physical copy of the award which was transferred to the next winner in the  competition (held annually or quarterly). There were several levels of the award, depending on the level of the socialist competition: all-Union, republican, oblast-wide, industry-wide, enterprise/institution-wide, etc.

A similar award existed in a number of other communist states.

Red banner in Soviet law
A new article, 190, was included in the Soviet criminal code in 1960s. It provided imprisonment for anti-Soviet agitation (part 1), for participation in unauthorized meetings (part 2) and for defamation of the Soviet coat of arms and the Red Banner (part 3).

Gallery

See also
Red flag
Order of the red banner

References

Military of the Soviet Union
Soviet awards